Sinamorata is a DVD by doom metal band My Dying Bride, produced in 2005. The DVD contains two promotional video clips, another two clips created by My Dying Bride fans plus live video cuts and art galleries of live images, band images and fan-made artwork. Also, the DVD has live footage from a Hof Ter Lo performance in Antwerp, November 2003.

Track listing
Live 2003, Hof Ter Loo, Antwerpen
"The Dreadful Hours"  – 7:47
"The Raven and the Rose"  – 6:11
"Under Your Wings and into Your Arms"  – 5:18
"The Prize of Beauty"  – 6:20
"The Cry of Mankind"  – 6:48
"A Kiss to Remember"  – 7:32
"Catherine Blake"  – 6:28
"She Is the Dark"  – 8:14
"My Hope, the Destroyer"  – 6:45
"The Wreckage of My Flesh"  – 8:49
"Sear Me"  – 10:10
"The Fever Sea"  – 6:23

Video Clips
 The Prize of Beauty  – 4:34
 The Blue Lotus  – 7:25

Fan Videos
 My Wine in Silence  – 5:57 
 My Hope, the Destroyer  – 4:48

Art Galleries
 Band Images  – 6:53
 Fan-Made Artwork 1  – 1:59
 Fan-Made Artwork 2  – 1:59

2005 video albums
My Dying Bride live albums
Live video albums
Music video compilation albums
My Dying Bride video albums
2005 live albums
2005 compilation albums